Benson Andrew Idahosa (11 September 1938 – 12 March 1998), was a Charismatic Pentecostal preacher. He is the founder of Church of God Mission International, Archbishop Benson Idahosa was popularly referred to as the father of Pentecostalism in Nigeria. Idahosa was the founder of Benson Idahosa University (BIU) in Benin City, Edo State, Nigeria.
His only son, Bishop F.E.B. Idahosa, is now the president of BIU, founder and president of Big Ben's Children Hospital, vice-president of All Nations for Christ Bible Institute International, among other positions.

Biography
In October 1968, Idahosa officially inaugurated the Church of God Mission International, which had started out previously, as a "small prayer group". A claim made by Idahosa that he had raised eight people from the dead was dropped when challenged by the Advertising Standards Authority, who sought evidence that the individuals concerned had in fact been dead. He was commissioned into ministry in 1971 by Pa Elton and James Gordon Lindsey. He was ordained a Bishop in 1981, and ordained several others, including Bishop David Oyedepo of the Living Faith Church Worldwide in 1989

Idahosa died on 12 March 1998. He was survived by his wife, Margaret Idahosa and four children. His wife subsequently took over as the Archbishop of the Church of God Mission International (CGMI), the Christian ministry he founded, she is also the Chancellor of Benson Idahosa University.

References

External links
 Benson Idahosa video channel on YouTube
 Founders of Church of God Mission, Worldwide. Available at https://web.archive.org/web/20080601025632/http://www.cgm-usa.org/
 Garlock, Ruthane (1982). Fire in his bones: The story of Benson Idahosa - A leader of the Christian awakening in Africa. Logos Associates, 
 Dictionary of African Christian Biography

1938 births
1998 deaths
Faith healers
Nigerian evangelicals
Nigerian Pentecostal pastors
Nigerian religious leaders
Nigerian television evangelists
Oral Roberts University people